Holostei is a group of ray-finned bony fish. It is divided into two major clades, the Halecomorphi, represented by the single living genus, Amia with two species, the bowfins (Amia calva and Amia ocellicauda), as well as the Ginglymodi, the sole living representatives being the gars (Lepisosteidae), represented by seven living species in two genera (Atractosteus, Lepisosteus).  The earliest members of the clade appeared during the Early Triassic, over 250 million years ago.

Holostei was thought to be regarded as paraphyletic. However, a recent study provided evidence that the Holostei are the closest living relates of the Teleostei, both within the Neopterygii. This was found from the morphology of the Holostei, for example presence of a paired vomer. Holosteans are closer to teleosts than are the chondrosteans, the other group intermediate between teleosts and cartilaginous fish, which are regarded as (at the nearest) a sister group to the Neopterigii.

The spiracles of holosteans are reduced to vestigial remnants and the bones are lightly ossified. The thick ganoid scales of the gars are more primitive than those of the bowfin.

Characteristics
Holosteans share with other non-teleost ray-finned fish a mixture of characteristics of teleosts and sharks. In comparison with the other group of non-teleost ray-finned fish, the chondrosteans, the holosteans are closer to the teleosts and further from sharks: the pair of spiracles found in sharks and chondrosteans is reduced in holosteans to a remnant structure: in gars, the spiracles do not even open to the outside; the skeleton is lightly ossified: a thin layer of bone covers a mostly cartilaginous skeleton in the bowfins. In gars, the tail is still heterocercal but less so than in the chondrosteans. Bowfins have many-rayed dorsal fins and can breathe air like the bichirs.

The gars have thick ganoid scales typical of sturgeons whereas the bowfin has thin bony scales like the teleosts. The gars are therefore in this regard considered more primitive than the bowfin.

The name Holostei derives from the Greek words holos, meaning whole, and osteon, meaning bone: a reference to their bony skeletons.

Systematics of Neopterygii
The evolutionary relationships of gars, bowfin and teleosts were a matter of debate. There are two competing hypotheses on the systematics of neopterygians:

Halecostomi hypothesis
The Halecostomi hypothesis proposes Halecomorphi (bowfin and its fossil relatives) as the sister group of Teleostei, the major group of living neopterygians, rendering the Holostei paraphyletic.

Holostei hypothesis
The Holostei hypothesis is better supported than the Halecostomi hypothesis, rendering the latter paraphyletic. It proposes Halecomorphi as the sister group of Ginglymodi, the group which includes living gars (Lepisosteiformes) and their fossil relatives. Ginglymodi and Halecomorphi form the clade Holostei, which is the sister group to Teleostei.

Ginglymodi comprises three orders: Lepisosteiformes, Semionotiformes and Kyphosichthyiformes. Lepisosteiformes includes 1 family, 2 genera, and 7 species that are commonly referred to as gars. Semionotiformes and Kyphosichthyiformes are extinct orders.

Halecomorphi contains the orders Parasemionotiformes, Panxianichthyiformes, Ionoscopiformes, and Amiiformes. In addition to many extinct species, Amiiformes includes only 1 extant species that is commonly referred to as the  bowfin. Parasemionotiformes, Panxianichthyiformes, and Ionoscopiformes have no living members.

Gars and bowfins are found in North America and in freshwater ecosystems. The differences in each can be spotted very easily from just looking at the fishes. The gars have elongated jaws with fanlike teeth, only 3 branchiostegal rays, and a small dorsal fin. Meanwhile the bowfins have a terminal mouth, 10-13 flattened branchiostegal rays, and a long dorsal fin.

Phylogeny of bony fishes

The cladogram shows the relationships of holosteans to other living groups of bony fish, the great majority of which are teleosts, and to the terrestrial vertebrates (tetrapods) that evolved from a related group of lobe-finned fish. Approximate dates are from Near et al. (2012).

Notes

References

External links
Holostei on The University of Liverpool website

 
Neopterygii
Extant Jurassic first appearances